Baisden is a surname.

Baisden may also refer to:

 Baisden, Logan County, West Virginia
 Baisden, Mingo County, West Virginia